A counting house, or counting room, was traditionally an office in which the financial books of a business were kept. It was also the place that the business received appointments and correspondence relating to demands for payment.

As the use of counting houses spread in the 19th century, so did their reputation as being often uncomfortable and dreary places to work.

See also
 Accounts payable
 Count room, a secure room for counting cash
 Exchequer
 Factory (trading post), a fortified settlement for the counting houses of overseas merchants

References 

Business terms
Accounting systems
Rooms